Beta Sagittarii (β Sagittarii, abbreviated Beta Sgr, β Sgr) is the common designation shared by two star systems in the constellation of Sagittarius, themselves designated β1 Sagittarii (itself a probable binary star) and β2 Sagittarii. The two systems are separated by 0.36° in the sky.

 β1 Sagittarii
 β2 Sagittarii

β1 Sagittarii's two components are designated β1 Sagittarii A, also named Arkab Prior, and β1 Sagittarii B (sometimes designated Arkab Prior A and B). β2 Sagittarii is named Arkab Posterior. Beta Sagittarii is also referred to by the traditional name Arkab.

Nomenclature
β Sagittarii (Latinised to Beta Sagittariii) is the groups's Bayer designation; β1 and β2 Sagittarii, those of its two constituents. The designations of β1's components – β1 Sagittarii A and B – derive from the convention used by the Washington Multiplicity Catalog (WMC) for multiple star systems, and adopted by the International Astronomical Union (IAU).

The system's traditional name Arkab derives from the Arabic عرقوب carqūb meaning Achilles Tendon. The two constituents bore the traditional names Arkab Prior and Arkab Posterior since β1 leads β2 (or β2 follows β1) across the sky. In 2016, the International Astronomical Union organized a Working Group on Star Names (WGSN) to catalogue and standardize proper names for stars. The WGSN states that in the case of multiple stars the name should be understood to be attributed to the brightest component by visual brightness. The WGSN approved the names Arkab Prior and Arkab Posterior for β1 Sagittarii A and β2 Sagittarii on 5 October 2016 and they are now so entered in the IAU Catalog of Star Names.

β1 and β2 Sagittarii, together with Alpha Sagittarii, were Al Ṣuradain (الصردين), the two Surad, "desert birds".

Namesakes
USS Arkab (AK-130) was a United States Navy  named after the system.

References

Sagittarii, Beta
Sagittarius (constellation)